Veliky Dvor is a rural locality (a village) in Piksimovskoye Rural Settlement, Vashkinsky District, Vologda Oblast, Russia. The population was 26 as of 2002.

Geography 
Veliky Dvor is located 50 km northwest of Lipin Bor (the district's administrative centre) by road. Popovka is the nearest rural locality.

References 

Rural localities in Vashkinsky District